Balinka may refer to:

Balinka, Hungary, a village
Balinka, Poland, a village
Balinka, a pit in Mount Pištenik, Croatia
Balinka, a river in the Czech Republic, tributary of the Oslava